Roger Ford (born 29 November 1965) is a New Zealand former cricketer. He played in 33 first-class and 11 List A matches for Canterbury from 1988 to 1994.

See also
 List of Canterbury representative cricketers

References

External links
 

1965 births
Living people
New Zealand cricketers
Canterbury cricketers
People from Leeston
Cricketers from Canterbury, New Zealand